Annaberg may refer to:

Austria 
Annaberg, Lower Austria
Annaberg-Lungötz, Salzburg, also known as Annaberg im Lammertal

Germany 
Annaberg-Buchholz, capital city of the Erzgebirgskreis district of Saxony
Annaberg district, a former district of Saxony

Poland 
 Chałupki (Racibórz County), a village in Silesia that is known as Annaberg in German
 Góra Świętej Anny, a village in Silesia that is known as Annaberg in German
 Góra Świętej Anny (hill), known as Annaberg in German

U.S. Virgin Islands 
 Annaberg, Saint John, U.S. Virgin Islands
 Annaberg Historic District
 Annaberg, Saint Croix, U.S. Virgin Islands

See also 
 Battle of Annaberg
 Annaburg
 Annabergite